Pakiri is a locality in Auckland, in the former Rodney District of New Zealand. The Pakiri River flows through the area and into the Hauraki Gulf to the north-east.

The area is named for the Ngāti Wai chief, Te Kiri. The beach was originally known by the name Ngā One Haea o Pākiri ("The Gleaming White Sands of Pakiri"), Pākiri being the name of the Ngāti Wai pā found at the headlands of the Pakiri River. Ngāti Manuhiri, an iwi descended from the early Ngāti Wai ancestors in the area, are the mana whenua for the Pakiri area.

Pakiri Beach is a  white sandy beach to the north. It is a tourist destination known for its natural environment.

During the 1860s, Pakiri Beach was the location of a kauri sawmill at the mouth of the Pakiri River. Suction dredging has been used to mine sand from the sea floor off the coast since the 1950s. This had caused some controversy in 1994, when  of sand was to be extracted to bolster the popular Mission Bay in Auckland, and was brought to the Planning Tribunal in the case Haddon v Auckland Regional Council for violation of the Resource Management Act 1991, and its provisions for kaitiakitanga.

Education
Pakiri School is a coeducational full primary school (years 1-8) with a roll of  students as of   Most children are of Māori descent and are affiliated to Ngati Wai and Ngati Manuhiri. The school celebrated its 125th jubilee in 2002.

References

Rodney Local Board Area
Populated places in the Auckland Region